Autodromo di Franciacorta is a  race track located in the homonymous area of Franciacorta from which it takes its name, in Castrezzato in the province of Brescia. The racetrack has received homologation from the FIA for motor racing competitions and from the FMI for motorcycling ones. The circuit was inaugurated in 2006.

The track hosted the NASCAR Whelen Euro Series from 2017 through 2019.

Lap records

The fastest official race lap records at the Autodromo di Franciacorta are listed as:

Notes

References

External links
Autodromo di Franciacorta race results at Racing-Reference

Motorsport venues in Italy
NASCAR tracks
World Rallycross circuits
Buildings and structures in the Province of Brescia
Sports venues in Lombardy